The fencing competition at the 1959 Mediterranean Games was held in Beirut, Lebanon.

Medalists

Medal table

References
1959 Mediterranean Games report at the International Committee of Mediterranean Games (CIJM) website
List of Olympians who won medals at the Mediterranean Games at Olympedia.org
L'Escrime Française magazine, issue 139 (December 1959), with tournament results (pp. 6–10)

M
Sports at the 1959 Mediterranean Games
1959
International fencing competitions hosted by Lebanon